Typhoon Angela, known in the Philippines as Typhoon Rosing, was a catastrophic Category 5-equivalent typhoon with  sustained winds, and the most intense tropical cyclone worldwide in 1995. Typhoon Angela was the third storm in a row that struck the Philippines, following Yvette and Zack. Typhoon Angela was the twenty-ninth tropical cyclone, and the fifth super typhoon of the moderately active 1995 Pacific typhoon season.

Angela caused PHP 9.33 billion worth of damage across the Philippines, in addition to 882 fatalities. It was the strongest typhoon to hit the Philippines in 25 years, and the costliest in 5 years.

Meteorological History

The monsoon trough that developed Yvette and Zack spawned another tropical depression on October 25 in conjunction with a tropical disturbance that originated in the Marshall Islands. It moved to the west, organizing very slowly to become a tropical storm on October 26. It maintained that intensity as it sliced westward, slamming the Philippines on November 2 as a slightly weaker  typhoon. Angela continued to the west-northwest, where upper level winds caused it to dissipate on November 7 over the Gulf of Tonkin.

Impact, records, and retirement

More than 900 people perished due to the catastrophic typhoon. It wreaked havoc over Metro Manila, Calabarzon Region and Bicol Region. Initially it caused 9.33 billion pesos of damage, but later on it grew into 10.829 billion pesos.

Throughout the affected area, more than 96,000 houses were destroyed, along with bridges and roads. The worst impact was in the Southern Bicol Region. Angela passed almost right over Manila, causing a significant impact both there and in Catanduanes. In Calauag, storm surge and flooding from a dam failure killed 121 people. In nearby Paracale, mudslides killed more than a hundred people. Power outages affected one third of the country.

Angela's 872 (910 according to the JMA) mbar pressure reading makes it one of the strongest typhoons on record. While this is low by the standards of any sea-level location, it is still behind Typhoon Tip, the most intense tropical cyclone ever recorded. However, Angela is an unofficial contender for world's most intense tropical cyclone. In a study utilizing the Dvorak technique for analysis of post-1987 typhoons, the authors concluded that Angela and 1992's Gay were higher on the scale than Tip. The authors also thought that Angela might have been slightly more intense than Gay, and hence Tip.

Angela was the strongest typhoon to hit the Philippines since 1970's Joan.
This makes it the typhoon with third-highest windspeeds recorded in the Philippines.

See also
 Typhoons in the Philippines
 Typhoon Mike (Ruping, 1990)
 Typhoon Xangsane (Milenyo, 2006)
 Typhoon Bopha (Pablo, 2012)
 Typhoon Haiyan (Yolanda, 2013)
 Typhoon Rammasun (Glenda, 2014)
 Typhoon Ketsana (Ondoy, 2009)
 Typhoon Goni (Rolly, 2020) – had a similar track and landfall date (late-October to early-November) in 2020.
 Typhoon Noru (Karding, 2022) – also took a similar track.

References

External links

JMA General Information of Typhoon Angela (9520) from Digital Typhoon
JMA Best Track Data (Graphics) of Typhoon Angela (9520)
JMA Best Track Data (Text)
JTWC Best Track Data of Super Typhoon 29W (Angela)

1995 Pacific typhoon season
Typhoons in the Philippines
Typhoons in the Federated States of Micronesia
Typhoons in China
Typhoons in Vietnam
Typhoons
1995 disasters in the Philippines